Tayler C. Sheriff is an American baseball coach, who is the current head baseball coach of the Western Illinois Leathernecks.

Coaching career
On July 11, 2022, Sheriff was promoted to interim head baseball coach of the Western Illinois Leathernecks.

Head coaching record

References

External links
Western Illinois Leathernecks bio

Living people
IUP Crimson Hawks baseball coaches
Penn State New Kensington Nittany Lions baseball coaches
Spalding Golden Eagles baseball coaches
Western Illinois Leathernecks baseball coaches
Year of birth missing (living people)